734 is an area code in the North American Numbering Plan.  Created in 1997, it covers southern portions of southeast Michigan, including all of Washtenaw and Monroe counties, and southern and western portions of Wayne County.  This area includes Ann Arbor, Ypsilanti, Saline, Chelsea, Milan, Belleville, Garden City, Wayne, Westland, Livonia, Canton, Pinckney, Plymouth, Plymouth Township, Monroe,  Petersburg, Bedford, Romulus, Huron Township and the remainder of Downriver south of a border formed by Goddard Road in Taylor and the northern borders of the cities of Southgate and Wyandotte. Area code 734 also covers the west side of the city of Inkster.

Area code 734 drew publicity after the release of the Juice WRLD song "734".   

This area had been historically served by area code 313, which today only applies to Detroit and its closest suburbs.

See also
 List of Michigan area codes

External links
 Map of Michigan area codes at North American Numbering Plan Administration's website
 List of exchanges from AreaCodeDownload.com, 734 Area Code

Telecommunications-related introductions in 1997
734
734